David Adams Leeming (born February 26, 1937) is an American philologist who is Professor Emeritus of English and Comparative Literature at the University of Connecticut, and a specialist in comparative literature of mythology.

Biography
David Adams Leeming was born on February 26, 1937, in Peekskill, New York, the son of Frank Clifford Leeming, an Episcopal priest, and Margaret Adams Reeder.

Leeming received his A.B. from Princeton University in 1958. In 1959 he did a summer course graduate study at the University of Caen. From New York University he received his M.A. in 1964, and his Ph.D. in 1970.

Leeming was Head of the English Department at Robert College in Istanbul, Turkey from 1958 to 1963. From 1964 to 1967 he was the secretary-assistant of author James Baldwin. Since 1969 Leeming was Assistant Professor of English at the University of Connecticut. He eventually became Professor of English and Comparative Literature at the University of Connecticut, where he in later years has served as Professor Emeritus.

Leeming has written variously in comparative literature of mythology and edited numerous encyclopedias and dictionaries on the subject. He has also written biographies on Beauford Delaney, James Baldwin, and Stephen Spender.

Leeming is a member of the Modern Language Association of America and the Federation of University Teachers.

Leeming married Pamela Elaine Fraser on July 2, 1967, with whom he has the daughters Margaret Adams and Juliet Ann.

Selected bibliography
Flights: Readings in Magic, Mysticism, Fantasy, and Myth, 1974.
Mythology, 1973.
 The World of Myth, 1990.
James Baldwin: A Biography, 1994.
A Dictionary of Asian Mythology, 2001.
Myth: A Biography of Belief, 2002.
From Olympus to Camelot: The World of European Mythology, 2003.

References

External links
 David Adams Leeming at LibraryThing

1937 births
21st-century American biographers
American lexicographers
American philologists
Mythographers
New York University alumni
People from Peekskill, New York
Princeton University alumni
University of Connecticut faculty
Writers from New York (state)
Living people
Academics from New York (state)